Adjoa Andoh HonFRSL (born 14 January 1963) is a British actress. On stage, she has played lead roles with the Royal Shakespeare Company, the National Theatre, the Royal Court Theatre and the Almeida Theatre. On television, she appeared in two series of Doctor Who as Francine Jones, 90 episodes of the BBC's long-running medical drama Casualty, and BBC's EastEnders. Andoh made her Hollywood debut in autumn 2009, starring as Nelson Mandela's Chief of Staff Brenda Mazibuko alongside Morgan Freeman as Mandela in Clint Eastwood's drama film Invictus. Since 2020, she portrays Lady Danbury in the Netflix Regency romance series Bridgerton. In July 2022, Andoh became an honorary fellow of the Royal Society of Literature.

Early life and education 
Andoh was born in Clifton, Bristol. Her mother, a teacher, was English, and her father was a journalist and musician from Ghana. She has a brother. Andoh grew up in Wickwar in Gloucestershire, where her family moved after her father got a job with British Aerospace. She attended Katharine Lady Berkeley's School and then started studying law at Bristol Polytechnic, but left after two years to pursue an acting career.

Career

Film, television, radio 
Andoh was a member of the BBC's Radio Drama Company. Her television credits include Casualty (she played Colette Griffiths (née Kierney) from 2000 until 2003), Jonathan Creek, EastEnders (where she played jazz singer Karen, the lodger of Rachel Kominski in 1991), and The Tomorrow People (where she played Amanda James in the story The Rameses Connection in 1995).

She has appeared in Doctor Who a number of times: in 2006 as Sister Jatt in series 2 episode "New Earth" and as Nurse Albertine in the audio drama Year of the Pig. In 2007, she appeared in several episodes of the third series ("Smith and Jones", "The Lazarus Experiment", "42", "The Sound of Drums", and "Last of the Time Lords") as Francine Jones, the mother of Martha Jones (Freema Agyeman). She reprised her role in the finale of series 4 ("The Stolen Earth" and "Journey's End"). Andoh's other television work includes playing the head of M.I.9 in Series 3 to Series 5 of M.I. High and D.C.I. Ford in Missing. In the American streaming television drama series Bridgerton (2020) she plays Lady Danbury. She played the guest role of Mother Nenneke in the second season of the Polish - American fantasy drama streaming television series The Witcher (2021).

She narrated the audio book versions of Alexander McCall Smith's The No. 1 Ladies' Detective Agency series of detective novels and Ann Leckie's Imperial Radch Series trilogy (although not all of the US editions), as well as Julia Jarman's children's books, The Jessame Stories and More Jessame Stories. She also narrated the audio book version of Nnedi Okorafor's novel Lagoon with Ben Onwukwe, and Chimamanda Ngozi Adichie's Americanah. She narrated The Power by Naomi Alderman, former President Barack Obama’s favorite book of 2017. Her career in audio dramas has included the Voice of Planet B in the science fiction series Planet B on BBC Radio 7. In 2004, she was cast in the video game Fable. In 2017 she provided the voice of war chief Sona in the video game Horizon Zero Dawn.

In film, Andoh appeared in Noel Clarke's 2008 film Adulthood and its 2016 sequel Brotherhood as the mother of Clarke's character, Sam Peel. She played Chief of Staff Brenda Mazibuko opposite Morgan Freeman's Nelson Mandela in Clint Eastwood's 2009 drama film Invictus.

Theatre
Andoh has worked extensively in the theatre. Her credits include His Dark Materials, Stuff Happens and The Revenger's Tragedy at the National Theatre; A Streetcar Named Desire (National Theatre Studio); Troilus and Cressida, Julius Caesar, Tamburlaine and The Odyssey (RSC); Sugar Mummies and Breath Boom (Royal Court); Richard II (Globe); Les Liaisons Dangereuses (Donmar Warehouse); Great Expectations (Bristol Old Vic); Blood Wedding (Almeida); Nights at the Circus, The Dispute and Pericles (Lyric Hammersmith); Julius Caesar (The Bridge); Purgatorio (Arcola); The Vagina Monologues (Criterion); Starstruck (Tricycle) and In The Red and Brown Water (Young Vic).

Personal life 
Andoh met her husband, Howard Cunnell, in 1994 when he took over the bookshop at Battersea Arts Centre, where Andoh's theatre company Wild Iris had an office. They have been together since late 1995, married in 2001 and have two daughters together (b. 1996 and 1997). Andoh also has a daughter from a previous relationship (b. 1985/86). Cundell has worked as a lecturer, writer, scuba diving instructor and a lifeguard. The couple live in Sussex as of 2022, having previously lived in Brixton. In October 2009, Andoh was licensed as a lay preacher in the Church of England.

Filmography

Film

Television

Selected radio

Video games

Awards and honours 
In 2022, Andoh was elected a Fellow of the Royal Society of Literature. Also in 2022, AudioFile named Andoh a Golden Voice narrator.

References

External links

 "What determines who we are? | Adjoa Andoh | TEDxBermuda". TEDx Talks, 8 December 2014.
 Adjoa Andoh Bio

1963 births
Actresses from Bristol
Alumni of the University of the West of England, Bristol
Audiobook narrators
Black British actresses
English film actresses
English people of Ghanaian descent
English soap opera actresses
English stage actresses
English television actresses
Living people
Royal Shakespeare Company members
Fellows of the Royal Society of Literature